Kolloorvila Juma Masjid is a famous Muslim worship centre situated at Pallimukku,  from Kollam city centre. Kolloorvila has the second largest Muslim population in Kerala. Kolloorvila Juma Masjid is one of the largest masjids in Kerala and can accommodate approximately 5,000 worshippers.

References 

Mosques in Kerala
Religious buildings and structures in Kollam district
Kolloorvila